Flying Paster (1976–1992) was an American Thoroughbred racehorse.

Background
Flying Paster was bred in California by his owner, Bernard J. Ridder of the Knight Ridder newspaper chain, and was named for a printing process mechanism.

Racing career
An outstanding racehorse, Flying Paster was foaled in the same year as Spectacular Bid, a future U.S. Racing Hall of Fame inductee and a horse that The Blood-Horse magazine rated as America's 10th best horse of the 20th Century. Ridden by Don Pierce, in 1978 Flying Paster was the dominant two-year-old on the U.S. West Coast, winning six stakes races, usually with a powerful stretch drive. He became the first 2-year-old to be voted California Horse of the Year.

With Pierce in the saddle to start his three-year-old campaign, Flying Paster won February's San Vicente Stakes, was third in the March San Felipe Stakes, then captured the West Coast's most important race for three-year-olds, the Santa Anita Derby, then captured the Hollywood Derby by 10 lengths. Sent to the Kentucky Derby, Flying Paster was the second choice among bettors behind the heavily favored Spectacular Bid. However, the colt suffered a cut in his right foreleg during the race and finished fifth. After tying the Pimlico track record for the first quarter, Flying Paster finished a distant fourth in the Preakness Stakes. He did not run in the third and final leg of the Triple Crown series, the 1½ mile Belmont Stakes.

Racing at age four, in 1980 Flying Paster finished second four times to Spectacular Bid, including in the Grade I Santa Anita Handicap. Ridden by Chris McCarron in 1981, he started the year with wins in the San Pasqual and San Carlos Handicaps, then made it three in a row by capturing the San Antonio Handicap.

Stud record
Retired to stud duty, Flying Paster sired 48 stakes winners and was California's leading sire from 1987 through 1991. His progeny included Grade I winner Cats Cradle and the Jack Kent Cooke-owned California Champion Flying Continental, whose wins included the Jockey Club Gold Cup. The 2015 U.S. Triple Crown winner, American Pharoah, is a fourth-generation descendant.

At the pinnacle of his breeding career, Flying Paster died unexpectedly at age sixteen from a heart attack on August 22, 1992, at Cardiff Stud Farm in Creston, California.

Pedigree

References
  Debra Ginsburg article for California Thoroughbred on Flying Paster and his son, Flying Continental
YouTube video of the 1980 San Fernando Stakes with Flying Paster and Spectacular Bid

1976 racehorse births
1992 racehorse deaths
Racehorses bred in California
Racehorses trained in the United States
Thoroughbred family 22